The South Central Athletic Conference (SCAC) was an intercollegiate athletic conference of historically black colleges and universities (HBCUs) that existed from 1935 to 1961. The conference's members were located in Arkansas, Louisiana, Mississippi, and Texas.

Member schools

Notes

Football champions

 1942 – 
 1943 – No champion
 1944 – No champion
 1945 – No champion
 1946 – 
 1947 – Alcorn A&M
 1948 – Unknown

 1949 – Unknown
 1950 – 
 1951 – Unknown
 1952 – Unknown
 1953 – Unknown
 1954 – 
 1955 – 

 1956 – 
 1957 –  and 
 1958 – 
 1959 – 
 1960 – 
 1961 –

See also
List of defunct college football conferences

References

Defunct college sports conferences in the United States
College sports in Arkansas
College sports in Louisiana
College sports in Mississippi
College sports in Texas